Cyclops is one of the only X-Men to be featured in every adaptation of the series. This is a list of all media appearances of the Marvel Comics character Cyclops.

Television

The Marvel Super Heroes
Cyclops made his first ever animated appearance in the 1966 series The Marvel Super Heroes episode of Namor "Dr. Doom's Day" with the original X-Men line-up (Angel, Beast, Iceman, and Jean Grey).

Spider-Man and His Amazing Friends
Cyclops appeared in several episodes of the animated television series Spider-Man and His Amazing Friends. He appears in the episodes, "The Origin of Iceman", "A Firestar is Born", "The Education of a Superhero", and "The X-Men Adventure". In the former, Iceman mentioned his eye laser as "devastating". George DiCenzo provided Cyclops' voice in "The X-Men Adventure" while Neil Ross provided Cyclops' voice in "A Firestar is Born".

Pryde of the X-Men
Cyclops appeared in the X-Men: Pryde of the X-Men animated pilot, wearing his old X-Men uniform from before he left the team. Michael Bell provided Cyclops' voice.

Marvel animated universe
In X-Men: The Animated Series, he wears his then current costume designed by Jim Lee. Cyclops was voiced by Norm Spencer in the English version, and by Kōichi Yamadera in the Japanese dub. In this version, Scott was the established team leader and was in a relationship with Jean Grey from the beginning of the series, acting more or less as his mainstream counterpart would. Throughout the series, Scott also discovered that his father was the space-pirate Corsair. During a battle with the government team known as X-Factor, Scott had to fight his brother Alex. Neither of the two seemed aware that they were brothers, and their powers seemed to have no effect on each other. When the series ended, Scott and Alex never had the chance to discover they are related. In the series, it was also revealed that he was one of the original X-Men members along with Beast, Jean, and Iceman. In the final episode of the show, a dying Charles Xavier tells him, "Scott, were I your father, I would tell you, 'no true a son could ever be'. I am proud".

He also guest starred in Spider-Man: The Animated Series in the 1990s in "The Mutant Agenda/Mutant's Revenge", along with the rest of the X-Men, when Spider-Man sought Professor X's help in curing his recent mutation crisis.

Fantastic Four
In Fantastic Four, Cyclops and the other X-Men make a cameo in "Nightmare in Green" watching the Human Torch and Rick Jones fly overhead.

X-Men: Evolution
In the later animated series, X-Men: Evolution, Cyclops was voiced by Kirby Morrow. Here, Scott Summers is the X-Men's field leader. In contrast to his mainstream version, this version of Scott is a confident and self-assured leader with a much more extroverted personality; his teammates all look up to him, especially since he was Xavier's original recruit; Rogue even has a crush on him after she joins the team, mainly because he continued to try and befriend her even when she initially distrusted the X-Men.

Throughout the first two seasons Scott tries unsuccessfully to win the heart of his longtime good friend Jean Grey, who initially rebuffed him despite secretly reciprocating his romantic affections. She later admitted her love for him after Scott was separated from the X-Men, lacking his glasses, and was discovered by Jean during a battle with Mystique. After graduating from Bayville High, Scott has become an instructor at Xavier's Institute for Gifted Children and is currently romantically involved with Jean. He also shares a close big-brother/little brother relationship with Nightcrawler.

In this series, Scott later learned that Alex, his brother, was still alive, and they often shared conversation by either telephone or actually meeting up with each other, although Alex declined full-time X-Men membership. Except for a short flashback, their parents do not appear in this series.

Wolverine and the X-Men

Cyclops appears in Wolverine and the X-Men voiced by Nolan North. He has been shown to be in a state of depression since Jean Grey disappeared. When Wolverine and the rest of the team locate Professor Xavier, Cyclops finally rejoins the team to help locate his mentor despite being initially reluctant. Wolverine and Cyclops, who have a rocky and nearly hostile relationship seem to have switched roles with Cyclops as the brooding loner and Wolverine as the responsible leader. His current costume in the show is similar to that of Gambit's (wearing his current mainstream costume with a long trench coat). Scott is convinced that Jean is still alive and spends much of his time trying to locate her, usually enlisting the aid of Emma Frost. He is willing to go to great lengths to find Jean, even going so far as to attack the Marauders, as well as their leader Mister Sinister, because he believes that Sinister has Jean despite having no evidence of this.

An exploration of his memories conducted later by Frost reveals that before Jean came into his life Cyclops was quite inexperienced and uncoordinated, until he met Jean and she "took the pain away" (in stark contrast to the comics, where he was arguably the most competent member of the original team without needing Jean to make him "complete" as an X-Man). When Wolverine joined the team, a jealous Cyclops violently attacked him thinking Wolverine was trying to steal Jean from him, and seriously hurting his own blooming romance with her before she suddenly vanished. He later risks his life to rescue Jean from Sinister and is seen reunited with her at the end of Season One. Had the show had a second season, it was planned that another future would feature Cyclops in his Age of Apocalypse characterization.

The Super Hero Squad Show
Carlos Alazraqui voices Cyclops in The Super Hero Squad Show episode "Mysterious Mayhem at Mutant Academy". He wears the outfit designed by Jim Lee as seen in X-Men: The Animated Series. He diligently takes notes in class and welcomes Reptil to Professor Xavier's Academy, appearing frustrated when Reptil shows more interest in Jean Grey. He is mind-controlled by the Ringmaster to search for an Infinity Fractal, -blasting Professor X's desk with a beam, and joining other mind-controlled X-Men. He can also be seen in a food fight and attending Wolverine and Storm's graduation.

Astonishing X-Men
Cyclops appears in the Astonishing X-Men motion comic, voiced by Greg Abbey and Mark Hildreth.

Black Panther
Cyclops appears in episode 5 of Black Panther. Nolan North voiced the role again.

Marvel Anime
Cyclops makes an appearance at the end of episode 5 of the Marvel Anime: Wolverine, arriving to give Logan a lift on the Blackbird. Cyclops appears next in the 12 episode X-Men anime series. He is voiced by Toshiyuki Morikawa in Japanese and by Scott Porter in English. The death of Jean Grey has affected this version of Cyclops in passive and optimistic ways. He is shown coping with Jean's death, ultimately being able to rejoin the X-Men's ranks as their confident and self-assured leader. Witnessing Jean being consumed by the Dark Phoenix entity has strongly angered him, but led him to want to stop the same tragic fate from affecting young mutants, devoting himself to teaching Hisako how to control her developing energy-based abilities so she could avoid the same fate.

The Avengers: Earth's Mightiest Heroes
Cyclops makes a cameo appearance -along with Beast and Wolverine- in The Avengers: Earth's Mightiest Heroes episode "Infiltration". He is featured on one of the photos of known superbeings pondered over by Nick Fury as he tries to determine which heroes he can turn to in the upcoming Skrull invasion.

Wolverine versus Sabretooth
Cyclops appears in the Wolverine versus Sabretooth motion comic, voiced by Trevor Devall.

Wolverine: Weapon X
Cyclops appears in the Wolverine: Weapon X motion comic, voiced again by Trevor Devall.

Marvel Disk Wars: The Avengers
Cyclops has a cameo appearance at the beginning of Marvel Disk Wars: The Avengers during the special presentation on the Raft. He is voiced by Takahiro Yoshimizu (Japanese) and Steve Staley (English). His fate remains unknown as the series progresses until episode 16, where it is revealed that he is trapped inside a DISK in Wolverine's possession. Wolverine gives the DISK to Hikaru, as Cyclops's DISK is an Energy-type one, and Hikaru D-Smashes Cyclops to aid Wolverine against Predator X and Baron Zemo. Howecerm before he could finish off the battle against Zemo, Cyclops runs out of time and returns to his DISK.

Ultimate Spider-Man
In the Ultimate Spider-Man episode "Beetle Mania", a Daily Bugle news crawl mentions Scott Summers to be introducing a new line of sunglasses.

Film

In the feature film X-Men (2000) and its sequels X2 (2003) and X-Men: The Last Stand (2006), and with a cameo in X-Men: Days of Future Past (2014), Cyclops is portrayed by James Marsden. Although an important figure and leader in the comics, his role in the films, however, is increasingly reduced in favour of Wolverine. Many fans were upset by the handling of the character and one IGN contributor wrote: "Cyclops was misunderstood, miswritten, misdirected and generally mismanaged in this series." In the prequel X-Men Origins: Wolverine (over 20 years before the X-Men series), actor Tim Pocock makes an appearance as a young version of Scott Summers. Tye Sheridan portrayed a young version of Cyclops in the 2016 film X-Men: Apocalypse, a cameo in the 2018 film Deadpool 2, and the 2019 film Dark Phoenix.

X-Men

In the first movie, Cyclops, like his comic book counterpart, is the leader of the X-Men, a teacher at the school, and is in a long-term relationship with Jean Grey. Cyclops successfully fends off Sabretooth and rescues both Wolverine and Rogue, bringing them to the X-Mansion along with Storm. Though he initially offers Wolverine a hand of friendship, he soon expresses disdain towards Wolverine due to his mocking attitude and flirtatious behaviour with Jean. After Rogue runs away from the mansion, he and Storm go to a train station to find her, but are ambushed by Toad and Sabretooth in the process. When Sabretooth pins Storm against a wall, Cyclops rushes to help her but is momentarily distracted when Toad removes Cyclops's visor with his tongue, causing him to unleash the full force of his optic blast, destroying the roof of the station, and Rogue is subsequently taken prisoner by Magneto. Professor Xavier organizes a rescue mission consisting of Cyclops, Storm, Jean, and Wolverine. Under pressure to stop Magneto, Cyclops expresses reservations about adding Wolverine to the field team due to his recklessness, but defers to Xavier's judgment and adds him to the mission.

After Xavier is poisoned while using Cerebro in an attempt to find Rogue, Cyclops, fearing for Xavier's life, promises to take care of the students no matter what happens and carries out the rescue mission. 
Upon arriving on Liberty Island, Wolverine is attacked by Mystique and the rest of the team are taken off guard by Toad who proceeds to trap Cyclops in a display cage, spit slime in Jean's face (which hardened, preventing her from breathing), and viciously beat Storm. Cyclops escapes the cage by using his optic blast to destroy the cage door and saves Jean from suffocation by blasting away the slime while Storm disposes of Toad. Magneto ambushes and traps the team by pinning them to the Statue of Liberty's structure, neutralizing his abilities by stealing Cyclops' visor and aiming him at Jean. Wolverine manages to free himself and engages Sabretooth in single combat, but leads him back to Cyclops and Jean, who work together to blast him from the statue. After breaking free, Cyclops consults the team and incapacitates Magneto with a well-timed shot through the moving machinery, allowing Wolverine to retrieve Rogue.

X2

At the beginning of X2, Jean tells Scott that she has a bad feeling that something terrible will occur, but Scott assures Jean that he would never let anything happen to her. Wolverine returns to the mansion, and the two resume their mutual dislike as Wolverine gives back Cyclops' stolen motorcycle and flirts with Jean. Cyclops accompanies Professor X to visit Magneto, who is locked in a plastic prison cell and while waiting for Xavier outside, Cyclops is attacked by Yuriko Oyama and the cell guards. Oyama shoots Cyclops with a tranquilizer round. Saved by his body armor, Cyclops immediately blasts her into a wall. Magneto's guards attack in retaliation, forcing Cyclops to engage them in hand-to-hand combat, even as Oyama recuperates. After knocking the three guards unconscious, Cyclops aims to blast open the cell door open to save Xavier when Oyama suddenly jumps on top of Cyclops from behind and knocks him unconscious. Cyclops is captured along with Xavier.

After William Stryker brainwashes Cyclops, Stryker has him waiting for the X-Men, ready to ambush them. Jean diverts from the rest of the team to try breaking the brainwashing and fight Cyclops, though he almost kills her in the resulting battle. After in intense struggle, the resulting shockwave of his dispersed optic blast cracks the dam under which they are fighting. Cyclops soon breaks free of his brainwashing and helps an injured Jean escape Stryker's facility. Once the team reaches the jet however, Jean decides to stay behind, engulfs herself in a flame-like Phoenix aura, and appears to sacrifice herself so the X-Men can escape the water. Cyclops immediately orders the other X-Men to go back, while none of them can, and shares a moment of grief with Wolverine. Cyclops becomes distraught and angered over Jean's sacrifice, even though Wolverine tells Cyclops that from the two, she chose him.

X-Men: The Last Stand

After the events at Alkali lake, Cyclops becomes increasingly angry in his grief over Jean Grey's death. Typically the most disciplined of Xavier's staff, Cyclops' behavior begins to worry Storm and Wolverine when he misses an advanced training session in the Danger Room. When Wolverine confronts him about his absence, Cyclops retorts bitterly that, "Not everyone heals as quickly as you do, Logan."

Cyclops withdraws from the mansion and returns to Alkali Lake. He hears Jean's voice in his head and begs for it to stop, finally unleashing the full force of his optic blast into the water. Surprisingly, Jean levitates out of the water, still wearing her uniform and appearing uninjured. Distraught and surprised by her appearance, Cyclops is taken off guard when she asks him to take off his ruby quartz glasses because she says she can control his powers. Cyclops removes his protective lenses, Jean telepathically neutralizes his optic blasts, with his eyes becoming normal (blue) for the first time since his powers manifested. However, Jean's intensity soon reveals that her persona has changed as the 'Phoenix' emerges; in doing so, Jean kisses him while disintegrating debris in the environment. Later, when Storm and Wolverine arrive, they find his still-floating ruby-quartz glasses hovering on the lakeshore. After speaking with Xavier about the power of the Phoenix persona and later witnessing her lose control to kill others, the team concludes that Jean killed Cyclops during their encounter at Alkali lake, though this is never confirmed. During the school's reinstatement at the end of the film, a memorial headstone for Cyclops is placed next to Jean's and Xavier's. Despite appearing in his X-Men leather uniform and battle visor in the film's promotional posters, Cyclops is never seen wearing either in the actual film.

X-Men Origins: Wolverine

A young Cyclops has a supporting role in X-Men Origins: Wolverine, where he is played by Australian actor Tim Pocock. He is first seen being scolded and sent to detention by his teacher for wearing his protective sunglasses in class. Later, while copying words on a blackboard, he is attacked by Victor Creed, who wants to capture him for William Stryker's mutant experiments. During the chase, Cyclops's sunglasses fall off and the resulting optic blasts damage the school building. He is finally taken prisoner and temporarily incapacitated with a carbon blindfold over his eyes, but he is soon freed when a vengeful Wolverine attacks Stryker's facility. While escaping, Cyclops leads the captive mutants and makes use of his eye beams to annihilate Stryker's minions, being pointed in the right direction by Emma Frost. He is then guided by the telepathic voice of Professor X who guides him and the other mutants to safety. Outside, he meets Professor X for the first time and leaves with the other mutants on his helicopter. Cyclops' optic blasts are represented differently here than in the comics, generating heat as well as concussive force.

X-Men: First Class

A young boy resembling Cyclops briefly appears in the 2011 film X-Men: First Class during the scene where Charles Xavier uses Cerebro for the first time. He is shown with similar sunglasses and a baseball glove; in the comics, Cyclops is a baseball fan. Although Alex Summers appears as part of Xavier's first team, his relationship to Scott is not mentioned.

X-Men: Days of Future Past

While in the past, the time-displaced Wolverine encourages the young Charles Xavier (James McAvoy) to reform the X-Men and recruit Scott for the future team, along with Ororo and Jean, arguing that the good they accomplished outweighs the bad they experienced. Reprising his role as Cyclops, James Marsden makes a cameo alongside Jean Grey (Famke Janssen) in the ending of X-Men: Days of Future Past, in which the events of X-Men Origins: Wolverine, X-Men, X2, and X-Men: The Last Stand appear to have been retconned. Cyclops is again in a relationship with Jean, and despite their previous rivalry, Wolverine expresses joy at seeing Cyclops alive again.

X-Men: Apocalypse

Bryan Singer confirmed in an interview that a young Cyclops would appear in the then-upcoming X-Men: Apocalypse set during the 1980s. In an interview with Yahoo Movies, Marsden suggested on seeing his Best of Me co-star Luke Bracey to replace him as Cyclops. Singer later confirmed that Cyclops is played by Tye Sheridan. Singer has revealed that Havok and Cyclops are indeed brothers, with Havok coming to take Scott to Xavier's after his powers manifest while he is at school during an argument with a bully. Although he and Jean initially argue after they meet, Scott apologizes to her after he receives his ruby quartz glasses, the two going on a drive into town with Kurt Wagner after he arrives.

The three arrive back just as the mansion explodes when Havok accidentally destroys the X-Jet while trying to stop Apocalypse and his Horsemen of Apocalypse abducting Xavier, with Quicksilver and Beast revealing that Havok was killed in the backfire of the explosion. When William Stryker's forces arrive at the mansion to investigate the telepathic broadcast that Apocalypse forced Xavier to send, Scott, Jean and Kurt are the only three students and staff to escape Stryker's attack as Scott had run into the mansion's ruins to try and find Alex, thus escaping the initial blast. As the three sneak onto the plane to follow Stryker's forces, Scott mourns the death of his brother, prompting Jean to reveal that Alex actually always thought Scott would be the greater of the two. After rescuing the other X-Men, Scott joins the final assault on Apocalypse, engaging Storm in battle before she turns against Apocalypse. In a deleted scene, Scott tells Beast that everybody should not call him Cyclops after gaining his Visor.

Logan

In the 2017 film Logan, it is explained that Professor X, due to his brain degeneration, caused an accidental psychic attack that seemingly killed the X-Men, and it is assumed (though not explicitly stated) that Cyclops was among those killed. Cyclops appears in the fictional X-Men comic owned by Laura, as illustrated for the film by Dan Panosian.

Deadpool 2

Tye Sheridan makes a cameo as Cyclops in Deadpool 2 in a scene where Deadpool questions why he never gets to interact with the other X-Men.

Dark Phoenix

Tye Sheridan reprises his role as Scott Summers/Cyclops in Dark Phoenix, set during the 1990s and adapting The Dark Phoenix Saga.

Literature
Cyclops is one of the main characters in the X-Men novel Shadows of the Past by Michael Jan Friedman, which sees their old foe Lucifer return from his apparent death. Still trapped in the Nameless Dimension, Lucifer captures Professor Xavier and replaces him with a duplicate made from ionic energy, this duplicate possessing all of Xavier's mental powers and memories but loyal to Lucifer. The duplicate tries to manipulate the original five X-Men into acquiring components that will allow him to create a device that Lucifer can use to escape the Nameless Dimension, but the X-Men realise the duplicate's nature and are able to use the machine to rescue Xavier while leaving Lucifer trapped. 

Cyclops is one of the main characters in the Chaos Engine trilogy, where a trio of villains- Doctor Doom, Magneto and the Red Skull- acquire a flawed Cosmic Cube and attempt to use it to rewrite reality to  fit their desires. Cyclops was one of the few X-Men initially unaffected by the reality rewrite as they were in the Starlight Citadel when Doom changed history, but they become caught in the subsequent changes when Magneto and the Red Skull capture the Cube. In the second book, Cyclops is rewritten as a loyal follower of Magneto's pursuit of human/mutant equality, but in the third book, he is a major leader of the Nazi war fleet, although he is actively hiding his mutant status. Fortunately, since the Jean of the Nazi world has no psychic training but is a mere housewife to Scott, the "original" Jean is able to re-take control of her body and then restore her teammates, allowing them to both stop Doctor Doom taking over the Citadel and then take the Cube from the Skull to restore reality.

Video games

Capcom series
X-Men: Children of the Atom (1994)
X-Men: Mutant Apocalypse (1995)
X-Men vs. Street Fighter (1996)
Marvel Super Heroes vs. Street Fighter (1997)
Marvel vs. Capcom: Clash of Super Heroes (1998)
Marvel vs. Capcom 2: New Age of Heroes (2000)
Ultimate Marvel vs Capcom 3 (2011)

He makes a background appearance in Ultimate Marvel vs Capcom 3 in a Days of Future Past-esque poster. It says he was slain.

LJN seriesThe Uncanny X-Men (1989)Spider-Man/X-Men: Arcade's Revenge (1992)

Konami seriesX-Men Arcade Game (1992)

Marvel: Ultimate Alliance seriesMarvel: Ultimate Alliance (2006)Marvel: Ultimate Alliance 2 (2009)Marvel Ultimate Alliance 3: The Black Order (2019)

Cyclops appears in Marvel: Ultimate Alliance, where Robin Atkin Downes is credited as the voice of 'Dark Cyclops'. He first appears in a cinematic detailing the failed attempt by various heroes, including Colossus, Hawkeye and The Hulk, to stop Doctor Doom from conquering Earth. He tries to defeat Doom with an optic blast, only for Doom to deflect the attack, with his new powers, back at him. He later appears in Doom's castle, having been corrupted, and transformed into Dark Cyclops, an evil version of himself that fights the heroes alongside Psylocke.

As one of the playable heroes available via download for the Xbox 360 and 2016 re-release version of the game, as part of the Marvel: Ultimate Heroes expansion pack, Cyclops is voiced by Scott MacDonald, who also voice his Dark counterpart of an additional special dialogue between two iterations of Cyclops, in which Dark Cyclops revealed to be a clone created by Dr. Doom’s power. He also has special dialogues with Jean Grey, and Dark Colossus.

Cyclops is also an exclusive playable character in Marvel: Ultimate Alliance 2, for the PSP, Wii and PS2 versions. He is voiced by Zach Hanks.

Cyclops appears as a playable characters in Marvel Ultimate Alliance 3: The Black Order. He was added alongside Colossus via the August 30, 2019 update patch, while being required to be unlocked in Infinity Trial mode. He is voiced by Scott Porter.

Nintendo seriesX-Men: Mutant Wars (2000)X-Men: Reign of Apocalypse (2001)

Paragon Software seriesX-Men: Madness in Murderworld (1989)X-Men II: The Fall of the Mutants (1990)

Sega seriesX-Men (1993)X-Men 2: Clone Wars (1994)X-Men: Gamesmaster's Legacy (1995)X-Men: Mojo World (1996)

X-Men Legends seriesX-Men Legends (2004)X-Men Legends II: Rise of Apocalypse (2005)

He appeared in X-Men Legends and its sequel X-Men Legends II: Rise of Apocalypse, where he was a very powerful character. He was voiced by Robin Atkin Downes (who also voiced Pyro) in X-Men Legends and by Josh Keaton in its sequel.

X-Men: Mutant AcademyX-Men: Mutant Academy (2000)X-Men: Mutant Academy 2 (2001)X-Men: Next Dimension (2002)

Other games
 Cyclops was a playable character in Marvel Super Hero Squad Online.
 Cyclops was a playable character in the Facebook game Marvel: Avengers Alliance.
 Cyclops appeared as a playable character in Marvel Heroes where Scott Porter reprised his role from the X-Men anime.
 Cyclops appears as a playable character in Lego Marvel Super Heroes, again voiced by Nolan North. He serves as one of the main story characters.
 Cyclops was a playable character in Marvel Avengers Alliance Tactics.
 Cyclops (in Marvel Now and 90s costume variants) is a playable character in Marvel: Contest of Champions for iPhone and Android devices.
 Cyclops is a playable character in Marvel: Future Fight''.

References

ru:Циклоп на других носителях